Polyhymno exalbida is a moth of the family Gelechiidae. It was described by Mikhail Mikhailovich Omelko and Natalia Viktorovna Omelko in 2011. It is found in the Russian Far East (Primorsky Krai).

References

Moths described in 2011
Polyhymno